The Gehrdener Berg is a forested ridge in the Calenberg Land in Hanover Region in the north German state of Lower Saxony. On its slopes nestles the town of Gehrden that gives the ridge its name. The ridge is about 2.7 kilometres long and is the sister hill range of the Benther Berg in southwest Hanover. Its highest point is the Burgberg at 155 metres above  sea level (NN).

Sources 
 Werner Fütterer: Gehrden – Vom Flecken zur Großgemeinde. Gehrden 1991
 August Kageler: Geschichte der Stadt Gehrden. Gehrden 1950

External links 

 Photos of the Gehrdener Berg

Ridges of Lower Saxony
Hanover (region)